Reid L. Bennett (February 7, 1929 – January 26, 2000) was a former Democratic member of the Pennsylvania House of Representatives.

References

Democratic Party members of the Pennsylvania House of Representatives
1929 births
2000 deaths
20th-century American politicians
People from Mercer County, Pennsylvania
People from Estero, Florida